Fighting With Buffalo Bill is a 1926 American silent Western film serial directed by Ray Taylor for Universal Pictures. The film is now considered to be lost.

Plot

Cast
 Wallace MacDonald as Ned Wheeler
 Elsa Benham as Doris Carberry
 Edmund Cobb as Buffalo Bill Cody
 Robert Homans as Caleb Crosby
 Cuyler Supplee as Bart Crosby
 Grace Cunard as Lola
 Howard Truesdale as Carberry
 Nelson McDowell as Lem Brady
 Harry Blake as The Boy

Chapter titles
Westward
The Red Menace
The Blazing Arrow
The Death Trap
The Renegade
The Race for Life
Buried Alive
Desperate Chances
The Shadow of Evil
At the End of the Trail

See also
 List of American films of 1926
 List of film serials
 List of film serials by studio
 List of lost films
 In the Days of Buffalo Bill (1922)
 With Buffalo Bill on the U. P. Trail (1926)

References

External links
 
 

1926 films
1926 lost films
1926 directorial debut films
1926 Western (genre) films
American silent serial films
American black-and-white films
Cultural depictions of Buffalo Bill
Films directed by Ray Taylor
Lost Western (genre) films
Lost American films
Silent American Western (genre) films
Universal Pictures film serials
Films with screenplays by George H. Plympton
1920s American films